Eva Gysling (born 10 January 1967) is a Swiss backstroke and freestyle swimmer. She competed at the 1984, 1988 and the 1992 Summer Olympics.

References

External links
 

1967 births
Living people
Swiss female backstroke swimmers
Swiss female freestyle swimmers
Olympic swimmers of Switzerland
Swimmers at the 1984 Summer Olympics
Swimmers at the 1988 Summer Olympics
Swimmers at the 1992 Summer Olympics
Place of birth missing (living people)
20th-century Swiss women